The 1903–04 Butler Bulldogs men's basketball team represented Butler University during the 1903–04 college men's basketball season. The head coach was Ralph Jones, coaching in his second season with the Bulldogs.

Schedule

|-

References

Butler Bulldogs men's basketball seasons
Butler
Butl
Butl